Henri Bentégeat (born 27 May 1946 in Talence, France) is a French Army general who served first as the Chief of the French Defence Staff between 2002 and 2006 and then as the chairman of the European Union Military Committee between 2006 and 2009.

Biography 
Bentégeat graduated from the French military academy École spéciale militaire de Saint-Cyr in 1967 and opted for the Troupes de marine branch. He held various staff and command positions - including several deployments to Senegal, Chad and Central Africa - until he took command of Régiment d'infanterie-chars de marine (RICM), which already was a professional regiment at a time when most of the French Army was still drafted. From 1990 to 1992, he served as Assistant Defence Attaché in  Washington, D.C. and from 1996 to 1998 was commander, French armed forces, West Indies (Lesser Antilles). He served as Assistant to the Chief of the Military Staff of the President of the Republic from 1993.

Bentégeat was promoted to the rank of Brigade General in 1995 and to Divisional General in 1998, when he became assistant to the Director for Strategic Affairs of the French Ministry of Defence. In April 1999, he was made Chief of the Military Staff of the President of the Republic, was promoted to Général de corps d'armée on 1 September 1999 and to Général d'armée  on 4 January 2001. He became Chef d'état-major des armées (Chief of the Defence Staff) in October 2002.

On 6 November 2006, Bentégeat took up the position of Chairman of the European Union Military Committee by appointment of the European Council. His term ended on 6 November 2009, when he was succeeded by Håkan Syrén.

Henri Bentegeat's education includes completion of the Junior Staff Course, Staff College in 1985 and of the Advanced Military Studies Course in 1992. He holds a bachelor's degree in History from La Sorbonne University in Paris and is a 1983 graduate from Instituts d'études politiques in Paris.

He is married and the father of four.

Promotions
Bentégeats promotions:
1968 – Lieutenant
1974 – Captain
1979 – Major (Commandant)
1983 – Lieutenant Colonel
1988 – Colonel
1995 – Brigadier General (Général de brigade)
1998 – Major General (Général de division)
1999 – Lieutenant General (Général de corps d'armée)
2001 – General (Général d'armée)

Predecessors and successors

Main awards and decorations
 Légion d'honneur (Grand Croix in 2016)
 Ordre national du Mérite (Officer in 1993)
 Bundesverdienstkreuz
 Legion of Merit

Publications

book
 Aimer l'Armée - Une passion à Partager, (To love the Army - a passion to be shared). Éditions Dumesnil, Paris 2011 -

articles

References

1946 births
Living people
People from Talence
French generals
Grand Croix of the Légion d'honneur
Commanders of the Ordre national du Mérite
Commanders of the Legion of Merit
Recipients of the Order of Merit of the Federal Republic of Germany
École Spéciale Militaire de Saint-Cyr alumni
Chairmen of the European Union Military Committee
French officials of the European Union